Christopher Nusa Ohenhen (born 14 October 1970), known as Ohen, is a Nigerian former professional footballer who played as a striker.

He spent the vast majority of his professional career in Spain, with Compostela.

Career
Born in Benin City, Ohen began his career at Julius Berger FC, then left at the age of 18 for Spain, where he would spend the following decade. He had participated at the 1989 FIFA World Youth Championship, where his three goals for Nigeria U20 attracted the attention of Real Madrid.

After two years playing solely with the reserve team, Ohen signed with SD Compostela, where he scored at an impressive rate. In his third year he netted 13 goals as the Galicians achieved a first-ever La Liga promotion, then scored a combined 42 times the following three; he was called up to a preliminary Nigeria national team squad for the 1998 FIFA World Cup, but did not make the final cut.

After a loan to Turkey's Besiktas, Ohen's final years were highly irregular, and he also dealt with injury problems. After an unassuming spell with CD Leganés, he saw out his career with his first club Julius Berger.

References

External links

1970 births
Living people
Sportspeople from Benin City
Nigerian footballers
Association football forwards
Nigeria Professional Football League players
Bridge F.C. players
La Liga players
Segunda División players
Segunda División B players
Real Madrid Castilla footballers
SD Compostela footballers
CD Leganés players
Süper Lig players
Beşiktaş J.K. footballers
Nigeria under-20 international footballers
Nigeria international footballers
Nigerian expatriate footballers
Expatriate footballers in Spain
Expatriate footballers in Turkey
Nigerian expatriate sportspeople in Spain
Nigerian expatriate sportspeople in Turkey